"Lose Control" is a single recorded by Chinese singer Lay for his debut extended play Lose Control. The song was released on October 28, 2016 by S.M. Entertainment.

Background and release 
Produced by Devine Channel and Lay, "Lose Control" is described as a "Pop-R&B" song that has a distinct guitar melody. The lyrics tells a story about a guy giving everything to a girl and as a result he loses his self-control. The song was released officially along with EP on October 28, 2016.

Live performance 
Lay performed "Lose Control" for the first time on the South Korean music program The Show on November 15, 2016. He also performed "Lose Control" along with "what U Need" at the SMG New Year's Eve Gala 2017 in Baoshan Sports Centre, Shanghai on December 31, 2016.

Reception 
"Lose Control" stayed at #1 on Billboard's China V Chart for 6 weeks in a row. The song topped "Alibaba Top 100 Weekly Songs" for 14 weeks in a row and was ranked #1 on YinYueTai's "TOP 100 Songs of 2016".

Charts

Notes

Sales

References 

2016 songs
2016 singles
Chinese-language songs
SM Entertainment singles
Lay Zhang songs